Thyatira casta is a moth in the family Drepanidae. It was described by Felder in 1874. It is found in Colombia.

References

Moths described in 1874
Thyatirinae